Issoudun is a commune in the Indre department, administrative region of Centre-Val de Loire, France. It is also referred to as Issoundun, which is the ancient name.

Geography

Location
Issoudun is a sub-prefecture, located in the east of the Indre department. It is in the former region of Berry.
The surrounding communes are:
 Les Bordes (4 km)
 Saint-Aoustrille (5 km)
 St. Lizaigne (7 km)
 Chouday (7 km)
 Lizeray (8 km)
 Condé (8 km)
 Thizay (8 km)
 Saint-Georges-sur-Arnon (10 km)
 Saint-Ambroix (10 km)
 Saugy (10 km)
 Saint-Aubin (11 km)
 Châteauroux (27 km)
 Châtre (41 km)
 Le Blanc (79 km)

Terrain
The river of Théols passes through Issoudun.

The commune of Issoudun takes up an area of 36.6 km².

Transport
The national road N151 passes through the area.

The nearest airport is the Marcel Dassault Airport, 27 km away.

The Issoudun station is located at 4 Pierre Favreau boulevard, 36100.

History

Middle Ages
During the 12th and 13th century, the history of the entire province of Berry, including the Lordship of Issoudun, was marked by the Capetian–Plantagenet rivalry. In 1195, Richard I of England defended the city from the advances of Philip II of France. Two kings met in December 1195 between Issoudun and Chârost, and reached an agreement, known as the Treaty of Issoudun. Around this time the beak-shaped keep of the castle was built. By the Treaty of Le Goulet (1200), Lords of Issoudun returned to the suzerainty of the French Crown. The most prominent Lords of Issoudun from that period were Odo III and his son Raoul III, who was married to Margaret of Courtenay. Since Raoul III of Issoudun died (c. 1213) without direct male heirs, the Lordship was passed to several secondary heirs, through the female line of succession. First of them was William I of Chauvigny in 1217, but final settlement was reached in 1221, after the intervention of the French Crown.

In 1499, Cesare Borgia, son of Pope Alexander VI, married Charlotte d'Albret, and as a dowry, was given, amongst other titles, the Lordship of Issoudun.

World War I
In 1917, the U.S. Air Service established its largest European training centre, the 3rd Aviation Instruction Center, about nine miles northwest of the town. At the time of the Armistice, 11 November 1918, thirteen fields were in operation and well over 10,000 ground personnel, student pilots and instructors were located there. It was at that time the largest air base in the world. A single monument on Department Route 960 remains to mark Issoudun's part in the Great War.

The United States Air Service formally left Issoudun on 28 June 1919, almost eight months after the war ended.  The sites of the former airfields have returned to their previous status as agricultural fields.

On 28 June 2009, the people of Issoudun had a commemoration ceremony in honour of the American aviators who had trained, and in many cases, died while training there.

Recent Events

On 14 July 2009, Bastille Day, Issoudun hosted the arrival of the 10th stage of the Tour De France.

Politics and administration

Territorial division 
Issoudun is a member of:

 The Communauté de communes du Pays d'Issoudun.
 The Canton of Issoudun.
 The Arrondissement of Issoudun.
 Indre's 2nd constituency.

Between 1973 and 2015 the commune was also attached to and divided by the two cantons of Issoudun-Nord and Issoudun-Sud.

Population

Landmarks

The International broadcasting center of TDF (Télédiffusion de France) is at Issoudun/Ste Aoustrille.  Issoudun is currently used by TDF for shortwave transmissions. The site uses 12 rotary ALLISS antennas fed by 12 transmitters of 500 kW each to transmit shortwave broadcasts by Radio France International (RFI), along with other broadcast services.

In popular culture
Issoudun figures prominently in Balzac's novel A Bachelor's Establishment (also known as The Black Sheep) which the Guardian has ranked as the 12th greatest novel of all time.

Culture
Issoudun is home to the Musée de l'Hospice Saint Roch, that consistently hosts contemporary art exhibitions.

See also
 Issoudun Aerodrome
 Communes of the Indre department
 Arrondissements of the Indre department
 Anglo-French War (1202-1204)
 Anglo-French War (1213-1214)

References

Sources

External links

 Town council website
 Notre-Dame du Sacré-Coeur
 Picture of Issoudun Basilica
 American Aviation during World War I
 ALLISS module installation 1992

Communes of Indre
Subprefectures in France
Berry, France